The following is a comprehensive list of universities in Japan that existed in the past. For the list of universities that still exist today, see list of universities in Japan.

Fuji Phoenix College
Kanagawa Prefectural College Nursing Medical Technology Public Health
Kanagawa Prefectural Junior College of Nutrition
Kanto Gakuin Women's Junior College
Kobe University of Mercantile Marine
Kugayama University
Kyoto College of Art, now part of Kyoto Gakuen University
Nagano Prefectural College, now part of The University of Nagano
Saga Art College, now part of Kyoto Saga University of Arts
Seian College of Art and Design, now part of Osaka Seikei University
Showa University College of Medical Sciences

References 

historical